The 1991 Manchester Open was the second edition of the Manchester Open men's tennis tournament and was played outdoor grass court in Manchester, United Kingdom. The tournament was part of the ATP World Series of the 1991 ATP Tour and was held from 17 June until 24 June 1991. Second-seeded Goran Ivanišević won the singles title.

Finals

Singles

 Goran Ivanišević defeated  Pete Sampras 6–4, 6–4
 It was Ivanišević' only singles title of the year and the 2nd of his career.

Doubles

 Omar Camporese /  Goran Ivanišević defeated  Nick Brown /  Andrew Castle 6–4, 6–3

References

External links
 ITF – tournament edition details

 
Manchester Open 
Manchster Open, 1991
Manchester Open
Manchester Open